The Tippecanoe County Courthouse is located on the public square in the city of Lafayette in Tippecanoe County, Indiana.  The public square is located between the north-south 3rd and 4th Streets and between the east-west Main and Columbia Streets.

It was listed on the National Register of Historic Places in 1972.  It is located in the Downtown Lafayette Historic District.

History
When the county was first organized in 1826, rooms were rented in which to conduct county business, until 1829 when the first courthouse was built; it was a two-story brick building.  It was replaced by a larger brick building in 1845 at a cost of about $3,000; there was a fire in this building in the 1840s, but it was extinguished before it could do any damage.  The third and current courthouse was built on the site from 1881 to 1884 at a cost of about $500,000.  It is built of Indiana limestone and is two-and-a-half stories tall on a raised basement.  Architecturally, it is a pastiche of styles including Second Empire, Beaux Arts, Baroque, Rococo, Georgian and Neo-Classical.  Paul Goeldner in his study of Midwestern courthouses called the building the "epitome of county capitals".

When Samuel Clemens visited Lafayette he was asked his opinion about the Tippecanoe County Courthouse by a local newspaper reporter; Clemens replied: "Striking, striking indeed! It must have struck the taxpayers a mighty blow!"  The comment was accurate as this was the most expensive courthouse built in the state until the Allen County Courthouse was built some twenty years later.  The courthouse has one hundred columns, nine statues, an elongated dome with four clock faces and a  bell tuned to C-sharp.  A 14-foot statue depicting liberty tops the courthouse dome at a height of 212 feet.

Attempted bombing
On August 2, 1998, perpetrator(s) crashed a pickup truck full of gasoline and explosives through the eastern entrance of the Tippecanoe County Courthouse. Local firefighters were able to put out the blazing truck—before any of the flammable materials in the truck were able to catch fire. On August 11, county authorities placed concrete barriers around the courthouse to help prevent a similar attack in the future.

A white male in his mid-40s was wanted for questioning because he was spotted near the scene around the time the truck crashed into the courthouse. Agents with the Bureau of Alcohol, Tobacco, Firearms and Explosives found evidence at the scene and sent it for processing but no arrest was ever made for the attempted bombing of the county courthouse.  In 2008, a $50,000 reward was offered for information leading to an arrest but no progress was made before the statute of limitations expired later that year. The case remains one of few unsolved suspected instances of domestic terrorism in the United States.

References

Further reading

External links

Information on Courthouse

Government buildings completed in 1884
Beaux-Arts architecture in Indiana
Neoclassical architecture in Indiana
County courthouses in Indiana
Buildings and structures in Lafayette, Indiana
National Register of Historic Places in Tippecanoe County, Indiana
Clock towers in Indiana
Individually listed contributing properties to historic districts on the National Register in Indiana